The  took place in 1181. Retreating from the Battle of Sunomata-gawa, Minamoto no Yukiie attempted to make a stand by destroying the bridge over the Yahagi River (矢作川 Yahagi-gawa) and putting up a defensive shieldwall. He was forced to withdraw in the end, but the Taira pursuit was soon called off when their leader, Tomomori, fell ill.

References

1180s in Japan
1181 in Asia
Yahagi-gawa
Yahagigawa 1181